The Maple Street Bridge is a girder bridge in the northwest United States in Spokane, Washington. It spans West Central to Downtown, crossing over the Spokane River and the Peaceful Valley neighborhood. Along with the Division Street Bridge and Monroe Street Bridge, the Maple Street Bridge is one of several major bridges that cross the Spokane River. 

It has two-lane traffic in both directions, and a caged pedestrian walkway. As of 2015, the Maple Street Bridge has an average daily traffic of 40,600 vehicles.

History

Construction began in 1956 and the Maple Street Bridge opened on July 1, 1958. The bridge cost $6 million dollars to construct, and required a ten-cent toll on vehicles from 1958 to 1981. During the first three hours, over 1,600 vehicles crossed the new bridge. The price was raised to 25 cents from 1981 to 1990, when the toll was removed.

Accidents

During construction in December 1957, an iron worker was killed when he fell  from a wooden platform.

In 2008, a teen died by accidentally falling from the Maple Street Bridge.

See also
List of crossings of the Spokane River

References

Buildings and structures in Spokane, Washington
Transportation in Spokane, Washington
Bridges completed in 1958
1958 establishments in Washington (state)
Transportation buildings and structures in Spokane County, Washington